Samsul Muhidin Pelu (born 21 September 1995) is an Indonesian professional footballer who plays as a midfielder for Liga 3 club Sleman United.

Club career

Bali United
He made his debut in the Liga 1 on April 16, 2017, against Madura United.

Persikad Depok (loan)
He was signed for Persikad Depok to play in the Liga 2 in the 2017 season, on loan from Bali United.

PS Mojokerto Putra
In 2018, Samsul Pelu signed a contract with Indonesian Liga 2 club PS Mojokerto Putra.

Bandung United
In 2019, Pelu signed a one-year contract with Bandung United.

Martapura
In 2020, Pelu signed a contract with Indonesian Liga 2 club Martapura.

References

External links
 
 Samsul Pelu at Liga Indonesia

Indonesian footballers
1995 births
Living people
People from Tulehu
Sportspeople from Maluku (province)
Persemalra Maluku Tenggara players
Bali United F.C. players
Persikad Depok players
PS Mojokerto Putra players
Liga 1 (Indonesia) players
Liga 2 (Indonesia) players
Association football midfielders